The 1996 UCI Mountain Bike World Championships was the 7th edition of the UCI Mountain Bike World Championships. The events included were cross-country and downhill.

The 1996 UCI Mountain Bike World Championships were the first to be held in Australia, all previous editions having been held in North America or Europe.

Medal summary

Men's events

Women's events

Medal table

See also
1996 UCI Mountain Bike World Cup

References

External links
Video highlights of the 1996 World championships
Photos from the 1996 UCI World Mountain Bike Championships

UCI Mountain Bike World Championships
International cycle races hosted by Australia
UCI Mountain Bike World Championships
Mountain biking events in Australia